Kozarac is a village in central Croatia, in the municipality of Gvozd, Sisak-Moslavina County. It is connected by the D6 highway.

History

Demographics
According to the 2011 census, the village of Kozarac has 122 inhabitants. This represents 41.93% of its pre-war population according to the 1991 census.

According to the 1991 census,   93.82% of the village population were ethnic Serbs (273/291),  0.34% were ethnic Croats (1/291), 0.34% were Yugoslavs  (1/291), while 5.50% were of other ethnic origin (16/291).

Notable natives and residents
 Mile Mrkšić, general

References

Populated places in Sisak-Moslavina County
Serb communities in Croatia